Lisarow railway station is located on the Main Northern line in New South Wales, Australia. It serves the northern Central Coast suburb of Lisarow opening on 31 August 1892 as Jenkins Siding. On 1 February 1902 it was renamed Wyoming and again on 2 April 1902 as Lisarow.

The station was upgraded in November 2021, with lifts added.

Platforms & services
Lisarow has two side platforms. It is serviced by NSW TrainLink Central Coast & Newcastle Line services travelling from Sydney Central to Newcastle. Peak-hour services travel from Central to Wyong via the North Shore line.

Transport links
Busways operate two routes via Lisarow station:
36: Gosford station to Westfield Tuggerah via Narara
37: Gosford station to Westfield Tuggerah via Wyoming

References

External links

Lisarow station details Transport for New South Wales

Transport on the Central Coast (New South Wales)
Railway stations in Australia opened in 1892
Regional railway stations in New South Wales
Short-platform railway stations in New South Wales, 4 cars
Main North railway line, New South Wales